Archie Goodwin (September 8, 1937 – March 1, 1998) was an American comic book writer, editor, and artist. He worked on a number of comic strips in addition to comic books, and is best known for his Warren and Marvel Comics work. For Warren he was chief writer and editor of landmark horror anthology titles Creepy and Eerie between 1964 and 1967. At Marvel, he served as the company's editor-in-chief from 1976 to the end of 1977. In the 1980s, he edited the publisher's anthology magazine Epic Illustrated  and its Epic Comics imprint. He is also known for his work on Star Wars in both comic books and newspaper strips. He is regularly cited as the "best-loved comic book editor, ever."

Biography

Early life and career
Archie Goodwin was born in Kansas City, Missouri, and lived in many small towns along the Kansas-Missouri border including Coffeyville, Kansas. He considered Tulsa, Oklahoma as his home town.  There he spent his teen years at Will Rogers High School and in used magazine stores searching for EC Comics. Goodwin moved to New York City to attend classes at what became the School of Visual Arts.

Goodwin began as an artist drawing cartoons for magazines and as a freelance "writer and occasional art assistant" to Leonard Starr's newspaper comic strip Mary Perkins, On Stage. His first editorial work was for Redbook magazine, on which he worked both before and after his Army service as a draftee.

Warren
His first story written before he went into the Army was drawn by Al Williamson and Roy Krenkel and published in 1962 just after his discharge from the Army.  He was never on staff at Harvey Comics.  By 1964 he was the main script writer for Warren's Creepy magazine. Much of his work there, according to Batman editor Mark Chiarello, was a "homage to the favorite comics of his youth, the E.C. line." By the second issue he was co-credited (alongside Russ Jones) as editor, and soon became editor of the entire Warren line: Creepy, Eerie and Blazing Combat. He worked for Warren between 1964 and 1967, as head writer and Editor-in-Chief, in which roles he is credited with providing a mythology for Warren's classic Vampirella character, as well as penning her most compelling stories. After his departure from Warren in 1967, Goodwin would occasionally contribute stories over the next 15 years and even returned for a short stint as editor in 1974.

Famous name
Archie Goodwin's first prose story was published by Ellery Queen's Mystery Magazine, which warned him he could not use Archie Goodwin as a pen name because it was a Rex Stout character in the Nero Wolfe books.  According to Goodwin's wife Anne T. Murphy, the magazine's editors "then  were so delighted when he wrote back to say that it was his real name that they used the anecdote as the introduction to the story, which ran in the July 1962 issue."

Comic strips and DC Comics
From 1967 to 1980, Goodwin wrote scripts for King Features Syndicate, including the daily strip Secret Agent X-9, drawn by Al Williamson, as well as working on other strips including Captain Kate. His experience ghost writing Dan Flagg inspired "The Success Story" (drawn by Williamson, who had ghosted on Flagg) for Creepy #1 (1964), famed among comic strip fans for its EC style dark humor in depicting a creator whose only contribution to the strip that made him rich was his signature.

Goodwin worked briefly for DC Comics during the 1970s, where he edited the war comics G.I. Combat, Our Fighting Forces,  and Star Spangled War Stories, and replaced Julius Schwartz as editor of Detective Comics for one year. Goodwin's collaboration with Walt Simonson on the "Manhunter" back-up feature in Detective Comics won several awards.  Goodwin also wrote the Batman lead feature in Detective Comics, where his collaborators included artists Jim Aparo, Sal Amendola, Howard Chaykin, and Alex Toth.

Marvel Comics
Goodwin first worked for Marvel Comics in 1968 and was the original writer on the Iron Man series which launched that year. According to Goodwin, when he entered editor Stan Lee's office to apply for a job with Marvel, Lee was in the middle of writing an Iron Man story and handed him photostats of the pages he was working on for his writer's test. Goodwin speculated, "I assume if he had been working on Sgt. Fury, I'd have been writing Sgt. Fury. Thank God he wasn't writing Millie the Model when I walked in." Goodwin and artist George Tuska co-created the supervillain the Controller in Iron Man #12 (April 1969).

Luke Cage, the first African American superhero to star in an eponymous Marvel comic book series, was created by Goodwin and artist John Romita Sr. in June 1972. While briefly writing The Tomb of Dracula series, Goodwin and artist Gene Colan introduced the supporting character Rachel van Helsing. Goodwin co-created (with Marie Severin) the first Spider-Woman, as well as writing her first appearance in Marvel Spotlight #32 (February 1977).

Goodwin also co-designed Marvel's New Universe line and created four of the eight series in the line. He explained, "[Marvel editor-in-chief] Jim Shooter keeps saying of me: 'Well, here's this guy, in one meeting, he suddenly spews out half the ideas for the New Universe.' What that doesn't take into account is that for about five or six years I've had these half-formed notions and finally here is a situation where they would all fit in. ...it wasn't like I just went into the meeting and suddenly four concepts sprang full-blown from my brow."

Star Wars

In 1976, Goodwin replaced Gerry Conway to become the eighth editor-in-chief of Marvel Comics, with the understanding that it would only be temporary until a permanent replacement could be found. He ultimately resigned at the end of 1977 and was replaced by Jim Shooter. While Goodwin was editor-in-chief, Marvel secured the rights to publish the Star Wars film's comic adaptation and tie-in series, which then sold phenomenally well (helped by a dearth of other Star Wars merchandise at the time) at a point when the comics industry was in severe decline. Goodwin recalled about the Star Wars comic book, "That really worked ... but I can't take any credit for it. Roy Thomas is the one who brought it to Marvel, and he had to push a little bit to get them to do it." He followed Thomas in adapting the Star Wars characters into an ongoing comic book with artist Carmine Infantino, as well as continuing the story (pre-Return of the Jedi) in a daily comic strip. Goodwin wrote the strips under his own name, although many websites and other sources erroneously claim he used the pseudonyms R.S. Helm and Russ Helm. Writer Mark Evanier corrected the matter by stating "Archie did write the Star Wars comic strip (as well as other Star Wars material) but only under his own name. Russ Helm was a completely different person writing under his own name." During Goodwin and Infantino's tenure on Marvel's Star Wars series, it was one of the industry's top selling titles. He wrote comic book adaptations for Marvel of the two Star Wars sequels as well as other science-fiction films such as Close Encounters of the Third Kind and Blade Runner. In 1979, Goodwin wrote an adaptation of the first Alien movie named Alien: The Illustrated Story which was drawn by Walt Simonson and published by Heavy Metal.

Epic

After Marvel Comics passed on publishing the American incarnation of Metal Hurlant (Heavy Metal), Editor-in-chief Jim Shooter was charged with producing an alternate title, which became Epic Illustrated. It was initially edited by Rick Marschall, but Shooter approached publisher Stan Lee to urge a replacement: "I told Stan, 'There's one guy who could do this. I don't know if we can get him.' He said, 'Who's that?' 'Archie Goodwin.' The reason I didn't think we could get him is because he used to be my boss and I didn't know how he'd feel about coming back and me being his boss."

Goodwin was at the time still working for Marvel as a writer, and Shooter recalls concocting a plan whereby the company "pretended that Archie reported to Stan. In fact, I was doing all the paperwork and all the employee reviews and the budgets" so that Goodwin could have the illusion of not working for his successor. In the autumn of 1979, Marschall was fired and Goodwin hired as Epic's editor.

Shooter approached Goodwin after the moderate success of the Epic magazine and creator-owned graphic novels to produce a full-fledged line of creator-owned comics, Epic Comics. Goodwin initially balked at the additional workload, and Shooter turned the line over to Al Milgrom before Goodwin ultimately accepted editorship.

Goodwin introduced the first English translation of Katsuhiro Otomo's Akira and published English translations of the work of Jean Giraud, a.k.a. Moebius.

Return to DC
Goodwin returned to DC Comics as an editor and writer in 1989. He wrote the graphic novel Batman: Night Cries painted by Scott Hampton and published in 1992. Throughout the 1990s, Goodwin edited a number of Batman projects, including the Elseworlds miniseries Batman: Thrillkiller, and the Alan Grant-written/Kevin O'Neill-illustrated parody one-shot Batman: Mitefall, a take-off of the "Knightfall" saga, filtered through the character of Bat-Mite. Armageddon 2001 was a 1991 crossover event storyline. It ran through a self-titled, two issue limited series and most of the annuals DC published that year from May through October. Each participating annual explored potential possible futures for its main characters. The series was written by Goodwin and Dennis O'Neil and drawn by Dan Jurgens.

Among Goodwin's most notable last editorial projects were Starman, written by James Robinson and first published by DC in 1994 and DC's Batman: The Long Halloween by Tim Sale and Jeph Loeb. Loeb and Sale's first work on Batman appeared in Batman: Legends of the Dark Knight Halloween Special #1 (Dec. 1993) edited by Goodwin. It is a testament to Goodwin that Loeb has said that Goodwin inspired their portrayal of Gotham police chief Jim Gordon in The Long Halloween and its sequel Batman: Dark Victory, while Robinson (who considered Goodwin both a mentor and close personal friend), continued to list Goodwin as a "Guiding Light" on later issues of Starman published after Goodwin's death. Goodwin edited Batman: Legends of the Dark Knight and Azrael. Goodwin's Creepy work is cited by editor Mark Chiarello as informing the creation of the Batman: Black & White series.

Death
Goodwin died of cancer on March 1, 1998, after battling the disease for 10 years.

Awards
Goodwin's work won him a good deal of recognition in the industry, including both the 1973 Shazam Award for Best Writer (Dramatic Division), and the 1974 Shazam Award for Best Writer (Dramatic Division) for the Manhunter series running in Detective Comics #437–443. In the same years, he also won Shazam Awards for Best Individual Short Story for "The Himalayan Incident" in Detective Comics #437 and for "Cathedral Perilous" in Detective Comics #441. In 1974, he also won Best Individual Feature-Length Story for "Götterdämmerung" in Detective Comics #443. All story awards were shared with Walt Simonson for Manhunter episodes). Goodwin's work on Manhunter, in which he both updated an obscure Golden Age hero, and, in the series' last episode, took the daring approach of killing him off (one of the few comic book deaths that has actually "taken" and not been reversed or retconned away in the decades since it occurred) is very well regarded by both fans and other comics professionals.

Goodwin stated in his final interview, "I think that Manhunter is one of just several projects that I've worked on that I consider a highlight in my career. It is something that I may never be able to top in a lot of ways. To have done that and for DC to have given me the opportunity to do that was great."

He won the 1992 "Bob Clampett Humanitarian" Eisner Award, and was named Best Editor by the Eisners in 1993. In 1998 he was entered into the Eisner Hall of Fame.  In 2008, he was one of two recipients of that year's Bill Finger Award, which annually honors one living and one deceased comics creator. The award was presented July 25, 2008, during the 2008 Will Eisner Comic Industry Awards ceremony at Comic-Con International.

Goodwin was similarly honored in 1998, being posthumously named to the National Comics Award Roll of Honour.

In 2007, Goodwin was inducted into the Oklahoma Cartoonists Hall of Fame in Pauls Valley, Oklahoma, located in the Toy and Action Figure Museum.

Appearances within comics
He makes a cameo appearance in a crowd scene on the splash page of Ms. Marvel volume 1 #15, with thought balloons showing him trying out various nicknames for himself.

In The Batman Adventures — the first DC Comics spinoff of Batman: The Animated Series — Goodwin appears as Mr. Nice, a super-strong but childishly-innocent super-villain. He is one of a screwball trio of incompetent super-villains that includes The Mastermind (a caricature of Mike Carlin) and The Perfessor (a caricature of Dennis O'Neil). Batman: Gotham Adventures #13 (June 1999) features the last appearance of the characters with Mr. Nice leaving the group to fulfill a prophecy, with the issue being dedicated to Archie Goodwin.

He is name-checked in issues of Marvel's Star Wars comics including in the alien-language words "Niwdoog Eihcra," his name in reverse.

A character based on him appears in issue #82 of Cerebus. He stands at the foot of the giant, living stone statue Thrunk and repeats everything Thrunk says - as if he is passing Thrunk's commands to the masses. Thrunk kills him when he steps on him. The scene has often been interpreted as an allegory for Goodwin's relationship with Jim Shooter, but Cerebus writer/artist Dave Sim denies this and said "I have nothing but the greatest respect for Archie and in no way intended anything but a little 'hello' to one of my favorite New Yorkers."

The airport in fictional Gotham City, home of the Batman, is named Goodwin, after Archie.

In Marvel Comics' What The--?! #5, Goodwin appears as King Archibald the First in the short story The Alien-Ated Legion, which parodies the mature approach of Epic Comics. In the last panels, King Archibald says that he had never been interested in superhero comics.

Bibliography
Atlas Comics
 The Destructor #1–3 (1975)

DC Comics

 All-Out War #4-5 (1980) 
 Armageddon 2001 #1 (1991) 
 Batman Black and White #1, 4 (1996) 
 Batman: Legends of the Dark Knight #132-136 (2000) 
 Batman: Night Cries HC (1992) 
 Detective Comics #437-443, Annual #3 (1973-1974, 1990) 
 G.I. Combat #158-168, 170, 172-173 (Haunted Tank) (1973-1974) 
 House of Mystery #198 (1972) 
 Manhunter: The Special Edition TPB (1999) 
 Our Fighting Forces #146, 150 (1973-1974) 
 Showcase '95 #11 (1995) 
 Star Spangled War Stories #167-171, 176, 189, 197 (1973-1976) 
 Unknown Soldier #234 (1979)

Heavy MetalAlien: The Illustrated Story (1979)

Marvel Comics

 The Amazing Spider-Man 150, Annual #11 (1975-1977) 
 Bizarre Adventures #28 (1981) 
 Capt. Savage and His Leatherneck Raiders #7 (1968) 
 Captain Marvel #16 (1969) 
 Dazzler #38-42 (1985-1986)  
 Epic Illustrated #2-3, 13, 17-24, 27, 29, 31-32, 34 (1980-1986) 
 Fantastic Four #115-118, 182 (1971-1977) 
 Hero for Hire #2-4 (1972) 
 Heroes for Hope Starring the X-Men #1 (1985) 
 The Incredible Hulk #106, 148-151, 154-157 (1968-1972) 
 Iron Man #1-28, 88-90 (1968-1976) 
 Iron Man and Sub-Mariner #1 (1968) 
 Justice #1 (1986) 
 Kull and the Barbarians #2 (1975) 
 Marvel Premiere #4 (Doctor Strange) (1972) 
 Marvel Spotlight #32 (Spider-Woman) (1977) 
 Marvel Spotlight vol. 2 #4 (Captain Marvel) (1980) 
 Marvel Super Action #1 (Punisher) (1976) 
 Marvel Super Special #3 (Close Encounters of the Third Kind); #16 (The Empire Strikes Back); #22 (Blade Runner); #27 (Return of the Jedi) (1978-1983) 
 Marvel Super-Heroes #15 (Medusa) (1968)
 Marvel Super-Heroes vol. 2 #4 (Spider-Man and Nick Fury) (1990) 
 Nick Fury, Agent of S.H.I.E.L.D. #6-7 (1968) 
 Nightmask #1-2, 4, 8 (1986-1987) 
 Pizzazz #7-16 (1978-1979)
 Power Man and Iron Fist #103-104, 108 (1984) 
 Rawhide Kid #79 (1970) 
 Savage Sword of Conan #1, 3-4 (1974-1975)
 Savage Tales #11 (1975) 
 Savage Tales vol. 2 #1, 2, 8 (1985-1986) 
 Sgt. Fury and his Howling Commandos #74 (1970) 
 The Spectacular Spider-Man #4-5, 7-8, 15 (1977-1978) 
 Star Wars #11-23, 25-45, 47, 50, 98 (1978-1985) 
 Tales of Suspense #99 (Iron Man) (1968) 
 Tales to Astonish #99, 101 (Sub-Mariner) (1968) 
 The Tomb of Dracula #3-4 (1972) 
 Unknown Worlds of Science Fiction Annual #1 (1976) 
 Wolverine #17-23 (1989-1990) 
 Wolverine/Nick Fury: The Scorpio Connection'' HC (1989)

References

External links
Archie Goodwin at Mike's Amazing World of Comics
Archie Goodwin at the Unofficial Handbook of Marvel Comics Creators

1937 births
1998 deaths
20th-century American writers
Artists from Missouri
Bob Clampett Humanitarian Award winners
Comic book editors
Inkpot Award winners
School of Visual Arts alumni
Silver Age comics creators
Marvel Comics editors-in-chief
United States Army soldiers
Will Eisner Award Hall of Fame inductees
Bill Finger Award winners
Writers from Kansas City, Missouri
Deaths from cancer in New York (state)